Dictya sabroskyi is a species of marsh fly in the family Sciomyzidae.

References

Further reading

External links

 

Sciomyzidae
Diptera of North America
Insects described in 1938